Arthur J. Tuttle (November 8, 1868 – December 2, 1944) was a United States district judge of the United States District Court for the Eastern District of Michigan.

Education and career

Born in Leslie, Michigan, Tuttle received a Bachelor of Philosophy degree from the University of Michigan in 1892 and a Bachelor of Laws from the University of Michigan Law School in 1895. He was in private practice in Leslie and Lansing, Michigan from 1895 to 1899. He was prosecuting attorney of Ingham County, Michigan from 1899 to 1902 and a member of the Michigan Senate from 1907 to 1910. He was United States Attorney for the Eastern District of Michigan from 1911 to 1912.

Federal judicial service

On August 2, 1912, Tuttle was nominated by President William Howard Taft to a seat on the United States District Court for the Eastern District of Michigan vacated by Judge Alexis C. Angell. Tuttle was confirmed by the United States Senate on August 6, 1912, and received his commission the same day. Tuttle served in that capacity until his death on December 2, 1944. He was the last federal judge in active service to have been appointed by President Taft. He was interred in Woodlawn Cemetery in Leslie.

Notable case
Tuttle oversaw the bankruptcy of the Lincoln Motor Company and set the date of the bankruptcy date as well as the minimum price of $8 million. Ford Motor Company submitted the only bid and acquired the company.

References

Sources
 

1868 births
1944 deaths
University of Michigan Law School alumni
Judges of the United States District Court for the Eastern District of Michigan
United States district court judges appointed by William Howard Taft
20th-century American judges
Michigan state senators
County officials in Michigan
United States Attorneys for the Eastern District of Michigan
People from Leslie, Michigan